Basem Ali (born 27 October 1988) is an Egyptian international footballer who plays as a right back for Egyptian club El Gouna, on loan from Al Ahly.

Career statistics

Club

References

External links
 

1988 births
Living people
Egyptian footballers
Footballers from Cairo
Association football fullbacks
Asyut Petroleum SC players
Al Mokawloon Al Arab SC players
Al Ahly SC players
El Gouna FC players
Egyptian Premier League players
Egypt international footballers